A village is a human settlement or community, usually numbering no more than a few hundred residents.

The Village or Village may also refer to:

Forms of administration
 Village (Taiwan), the basic unit of Taiwanese administrative subdivision
 Village (United States), a type of administrative division at the local government level
 Village (New Jersey), a form of municipal government
 Village (Pennsylvania), a geographic area within a larger political subdivision
 Village (Oregon), a model of local governance
 Village (Vermont), a named community within the boundaries of an incorporated town
 Villages of Brunei, third-level administrative division of Brunei
Village (Philippines), smallest administrative division
Also, a subdivision

Places

Canada
 The Village, Newfoundland and Labrador, a nickname for Victoria
 Village Island, in the Johnstone Strait region of the British Columbia Coast

Ireland
 The Village, Cloughjordan, an eco-village
 The Village, a commonly used name for Malahide Cricket Club Ground

United Kingdom
 Village (ward), an electoral ward of Trafford, Greater Manchester, England
 The Village, East Kilbride, South Lanarkshire, Scotland
 The Village, an area near Donegall Road in Belfast, Northern Ireland
 The Village, a settlement in Windsor Great Park, England

United States
 Village, Arkansas
 Village, Virginia
 Greenwich Village, New York City
 The Village, Jersey City, New Jersey
 The Village, Oklahoma
 The Village at Corte Madera, a shopping center in Corte Madera, California
 The Village Shopping Center, Gary, Indiana
 The Villages, Florida
 Village Arcade, a shopping center in Rice Village, Houston, Texas
 Village of La Jolla, California
 The Village at Castle Pines, Colorado

Elsewhere
 Burnside Village in Glenside, South Australia, colloquially known as "The Village"
 The Village, a zone in San Ġwann, Malta

Arts, entertainment, and media

Films
 The Village (1953 film), a Swiss drama film
 The Village (1968 film), Irish documentary; see Paul Hockings
 The Village (2004 film), an American period thriller film
 The Village (2015 film), a Georgian drama film

Music
Village (album), 1997 album by jazz trumpeter Wallace Roney
 "The Village", a song by New Order on the 1983 album Power, Corruption & Lies
 "Villages", a song from the 2012 album A Is for Alpine by Alpine
 "The Village", a 2017 single by Wrabel

Literature
 The Village (Anand novel), a 1910 novel by Mulk Raj Anand
 The Village (Bunin novel), a 1939 novel by Ivan Bunin
 The Village (Grigorovich novel), an 1846 novel by Dmitry Grigorovich
 The Village (Lalwani novel), by Nikita Lalwani
 "The Village" (poem), by George Crabbe
 "The Village" (short story), by Kate Wilhelm

Periodicals
 Village (magazine), an Irish current affairs magazine founded by Vincent Browne
 The Village Voice, an American news and culture paper

Television
 The Village (1993 TV series), British radio and television series
 The Village (2013 TV series), BBC television series
  The Village (2019 TV series), an American drama television series on NBC
 The Village (The Prisoner), the fictional setting of the 1960s UK television series, The Prisoner
 The Village: Achiara's Secret, South Korean drama series

Other uses in arts, entertainment, and media
 The Village (Sirius XM), a radio channel
 Village (board game)
 Resident Evil Village (2021 video game) "Village", a video game in the Resident Evil franchise

Companies and organizations
 Elder village, a type of organization providing living-services support to the elderly
 MSN Games, formerly known as The Village, a gaming web site
 The Village (Hartford, Connecticut), a social service agency
 The Village (music venue), in Dublin
 The Village (studio), a recording studio in West Los Angeles (Santa Monica), California
 Village Community Co-operative, a multiple occupancy permaculture project in Adelaide, Australia
 Village Fair, an annual music festival in Bathurst, Australia
 Village Food Stores (1987–95), a chain of supermarkets in New Brunswick, Canada

Other uses
 Mark Village (born 1991), Canadian soccer player

See also

 Village Creek (disambiguation)
 Village Green (disambiguation)
 Villager (disambiguation)